Mukaj is a village in the former municipality of Bërxullë in Tirana County, Albania. At the 2015 local government reform it became part of the municipality Vorë.

References

Populated places in Vorë
Villages in Tirana County